Syrian War may refer to:

 Syrian Wars, a series of wars between 274 BC and 168 BC
 Roman–Seleucid War (192 BC–188 BC)
 Egyptian–Ottoman War (1831–33), also known as the First Syrian War
 Egyptian–Ottoman War (1839–41), also known as the Second Syrian War 
 Franco-Syrian War (1920)
 Syria–Lebanon Campaign (1941)
 Syrian civil war (2011–present), an ongoing war in Syria

See also 
 Syrian Revolution (disambiguation)
 Syrian coup d'état (disambiguation)